The Free Reformed Churches in South Africa (also known as the Vrye Gereformeerde Kerke in Suid Afrika) is a federation of Protestant Christian churches. It follows Reformed Calvinist theology and has adopted the Dutch "three forms of unity" as its doctrinal standards: Canons of Dordt, Belgic Confession and the Heidelberg Catechism and subscribes to the three Ecumenical Creeds: The Apostles' Creed, The Nicene Creed and The Athanasian Creed.

The first church was established in Pretoria on 8 October 1950. Eventually other churches were established; they are, in order of institution:

 FRC Pretoria, 1950
 FRC Cape Town, 1952
 FRC Johannesburg, 1957
 FRC Bethal, 1995
 FRC Pretoria-Maranata, 1997
 FRC Mamelodi, 2002
 FRC Soshanguve North, 2003

The FRC's Church Order is based on that which was written at the Synod of Dort 1618/19.

The Churches have sister-church relationships with the Reformed Churches in the Netherlands (Liberated), the Canadian and American Reformed Churches, the Presbyterian Church in Korea and the Free Reformed Churches of Australia.

In addition to these contacts the FRC is also a member of the International Conference of Reformed Churches (ICRC)

External links
Official web site for the Free Reformed Churches of South Africa

Protestantism in South Africa
Reformed denominations in Africa
1950 establishments in South Africa